Aapo Ilmari Halme (born 22 May 1998) is a Finnish professional footballer who plays as a centre-back for Finnish Veikkausliiga club HJK. He also represents the Finland national under-21 football team. Halme was born in Helsinki, Finland. He began his senior club career playing for Honka, before signing with HJK Helsinki at age 17 in 2015. He would go on to win the 2017 Veikkausliiga and 2016–17 Finnish Cup.

Formerly an international at under-16, under-17, under-18, under-19, under-20 and under-21 level. Halme was nominated to Finland´s preliminary UEFA Euro 2020 team but he did not make it to the final squad.

Club career

Early career
Halme started his youth career at FC Honka, making 1 senior appearance before joining Klubi-04, where he made 15 appearances and scored once.

HJK Helsinki
The winners of the 2015 Finnish League Cup HJK Helsinki brought in Halme from Klubi-04 on a three-year deal expiring at the end of the 2018 season as stated in his contractual obligation. He made 29 league appearances over three seasons with the club, scoring once.

Leeds United
On 3 January 2018, Halme signed for Leeds United on a four-year contract for an unknown fee, reported to be less than £500,000. He became the fourth Finnish player to sign for Leeds after Sebastian Sorsa, Mika Väyrynen and Mikael Forssell.

However, Halme picked up a serious foot injury during one of his first training sessions at Leeds in January, which was to rule him out for the remainder of the season. After nearly nine months out injured, on 27 August 2018, Halme made his first appearance for the club representing Leeds Under 23's against Queens Park Rangers' Development squad. On 23 November 2018, Leeds' first-team head coach Marcelo Bielsa gave Halme special praise after returning from his long injury layoff. He made his debut the next day in the EFL Championship against Bristol City in a 2–0 win, after being named in the starting lineup after an injury to Pontus Jansson and long-term injuries to Luke Ayling and Gaetano Berardi.

He scored his first goal for Leeds on 6 January 2019 during a 2–1 defeat to Queens Park Rangers in the third round of the FA Cup.

Halme was regularly named as an unused substitute on the bench for the first team squad in the Championship, but still featured regularly for Carlos Corberán's under 23's side that won the 2018-19 Professional Development League Northern Section. They then became the national Professional Development League champions by beating Birmingham City in the final.

Barnsley
On 3 July 2019, Halme joined Championship club Barnsley for an undisclosed fee. He made his debut for Barnsley on 13 August in a EFL Cup match against Carlisle United. He scored his first goal for Barnsley in a 2–2 draw with Derby County on 2 October 2019.

Return to HJK
On 25 July 2022 it was announced that Halme had signed a contract with HJK until the end of 2024.

International career

Finland youth teams
Halme has represented Finland at U16, U17, U18 and U19 levels. He made his debut for Finland U21's on 8 June 2017 against Ukraine U21's. On 23 March 2019, Halme captained Finland U21 to an 8–3 victory against Norway U21.

Finland first team
Halme was called up for the UEFA Euro 2020 pre-tournament friendly match against Sweden on 29 May 2021 but he remained as an unused substitute.

Career statistics

Honours

Club
HJK
Veikkausliiga: 2017
Finnish Cup: 2016–17

References

External links

 Aapo Halme – SPL competition record  

1998 births
Living people
Footballers from Helsinki
Finnish footballers
Finland youth international footballers
Association football defenders
Klubi 04 players
Helsingin Jalkapalloklubi players
Leeds United F.C. players
Finnish expatriate footballers
Expatriate footballers in England
Finnish expatriate sportspeople in England
Finland under-21 international footballers
21st-century Finnish people